Bijoy 1971 is a sculpture by Mahmudul Hasan Shohag in Bharat-Bangladesh Maitri Udyan on 2016. It is (12 feet) high and is located in Bharat-Bangladesh Maitri Udyan, India.

The sculptor tribute to Indian soldiers and Bangladeshi Freedom Fighters who sacrificed their lives during the Liberation War.

References 

Asian sculpture
 
 
South Asia
Sculpture
Sculptures by Mahmudul Hasan Shohag